Adam Galos (22 July 1924 – 11 April 2013) was a Polish historian and professor at University of Wrocław. He specialized in the history of Germany.  He died, aged 88, in Wrocław.

He spent his childhood in Warsaw, where his father worked as officer. In 1946 he graduated at history and started working at University of Wrocław. In 1949 Galos gained PhD. The topic of his thesis was Społeczeństwo niemieckie wobec ustaw antypolskich 1894–1909.

Works 
Rugi pruskie na Górnym Śląsku (1885-1890) (1954)
Historia Niemiec (1981, with Władysław Czapliński and Wacław Korta)

Notes

References

Further reading 
Kto jest kim we Wrocławiu. Informator biograficzny, wyd. Wrocław 1999

20th-century Polish historians
Polish male non-fiction writers
1924 births
2013 deaths
Historians of Poland
Historians of Germany
Academic staff of the University of Wrocław
Recipients of the Order of Polonia Restituta
Writers from Kraków